Amagalantuy (Amgalanta) is a rural locality (an ulus) in Bichursky District, Republic of Buryatia, Russia. The population was 45 in 2010. There are two streets.

Geography 
Amagalantuy is located 56 km northeast of Bichura (the district's administrative centre) by road. Shanaga is the nearest rural locality.

References 

Rural localities in Bichursky District